Jean Hesnault (or Hénaut, Dehénault, d'Hénault, de Hénault), 1611–1682, was a French poet, libertine in morals and thought, friend of Molière and Chapelle.

In addition to his original production, he translated Latin poems with a materialist tendency (beginning of De natura rerum by Lucretius, chorus of the second act of the Troade by Seneca... ).

Editions 
 Œuvres diverses..., Paris, 1670.
 Dialogues ou Entretiens..., Rouen, 1709. (Same content as the previous edition.)
 Pieces published in various collections.
 Œuvres, ed. by Fr. Lachèvre, Paris, Champion, 1922.
 Some poems of Hénault can be found in Alain Niderst, La poésie à l'âge baroque, Paris, Laffont, coll. Bouquins, 2005, pp. 767–774.

Studies 
 René Pintard, Le libertinage érudit dans la première moitié du XVIIe siècle, Paris, 1943, 2 volumes. (Repr. Slatkine, 1995, 2000, 2003.)
 René Pintard : « Un ami mal connu de Molière : Jean de Hénault », Revue d'histoire littéraire de la France, septembere-October 1972, p. 954-975.
 Alain Niderst : « Jean Hénault (suite) », Revue d'histoire littéraire de la France, septembre-|octobre 1978, p. 707-721.

17th-century French writers
1611 births
1682 deaths